Vityaz Ice Palace is an indoor sporting arena located in Podolsk, Russia.  The capacity of the arena is 5,500 and was built in 2000. The home games of Vityaz Podolsk and its junior team : Russkie Vityazi are played in the arena. Until 2006 it was the home arena of the HC MVD ice hockey team.

Indoor ice hockey venues in Russia
Indoor arenas in Russia
HC MVD
HC Vityaz